Tragocephala angolensis is a species of beetle in the family Cerambycidae. It was described by Per Olof Christopher Aurivillius in 1916. It is known from Angola. It contains the varietas Tragocephala angolensis var. flavotecta.

References

Endemic fauna of Angola
angolensis
Beetles described in 1916